István Apáti (born 23 March 1978) is a Hungarian jurist and politician from the Our Home Movement political party. He left the right-wing radical Jobbik party on 7 November 2018. He is a member of the National Assembly (MP) since 2010. He also served as Vice Chairman of the Parliamentary Committee on Local Government and Regional Development. Since 22 August 2020, he is the elected vice president in Our Homeland Movement.

Personal life
He is married. His wife is Dr Zsuzsanna Apátiné Pál-Katona. They have a daughter, Zselyke.

References

External links
Parlamenti önéletrajza
Önéletrajza a Jobbik honlapján
Rövid ismertető róla

1978 births
Living people
Hungarian jurists
People from Csenger
Jobbik politicians
Our Homeland Movement politicians
Members of the National Assembly of Hungary (2010–2014)
Members of the National Assembly of Hungary (2014–2018)
Members of the National Assembly of Hungary (2018–2022)
Members of the National Assembly of Hungary (2022–2026)